Vik Edwin Stoll (born April 3, 1954) is the Deputy Chief Administrative Officer and Director of Collections for Jackson County, Missouri and is a former nominee to be a judge of the United States Tax Court.

Biography

Stoll received a Bachelor of Science degree from the University of Missouri and a Juris Doctor from the University of Missouri School of Law. He served at the law firm of Morris & King P.C., as an associate from 1979 to 1984 and as a shareholder and director from 1984 to 1990. He served at Hillix, Brewer, Hoffhaus, Whittaker & Wright LLC from 1990 to 1998. From 1998 to 2009, he was a partner at Morrison & Hecker LLP, later known at Stinson Morrison Hecker LLP. From 2009 to 2012, he served as Jackson County, Missouri's Director of Collections. He is currently the Deputy Chief Administrative Officer and Director of Collections for Jackson County, Missouri.

Expired nomination to tax court

On November 9, 2015, President Obama nominated Stoll to serve as a Judge of the United States Tax Court, to the seat vacated by Judge James S. Halpern, who retired. He received a hearing before the United States Senate Committee on Finance on January 29, 2016. On April 18, 2016 his nomination was reported out of committee by a 26–0 vote. His nomination expired on January 3, 2017, with the end of the 114th Congress.

References

1954 births
Living people
Missouri lawyers
University of Missouri alumni
University of Missouri School of Law alumni